Attention deficit may refer to:

 Attention deficit hyperactivity disorder
 Attention deficit hyperactivity disorder predominantly inattentive
 Attention Deficit (album), a 2009 hip hop album by Wale